Willard Livingstone Beard (Pinyin: Bì Yìzhī; Foochow Romanized: Bĭ Ék-dĭ; February 5, 1865 – April 15, 1947) was an American missionary serving under the American Board of Commissioners for Foreign Missions in Foochow, China.

Life 
Willard Livingstone Beard was born in Huntington, Connecticut on February 5, 1865. He enrolled at Oberlin College in 1887, and graduated with a Bachelor of Arts in 1891. In 1894 he graduated from Hartford Seminary.

In 1894, Beard started missionary work to China. He first began as a missionary for the American Board of Commissioners for Foreign Missions from 1894 to 1904. In 1904, he was released to start a YMCA in Fukien Province (now Fujian), for which he served as general secretary until 1909. In 1910, he returned to the United States, and served as a secretary of the ABCFM in New York City for two years. In 1912, Beard returned to China, and held a position as president of Foochow College until 1927. From 1927 to 1936 he returned to general missionary work in China. And after a brief time home in the United States, Beard served two more years for the ABCFM in Foochow.

At the outbreak of World War II, Beard returned to his hometown, where he remained for the rest of his life. On April 15, 1947, he died of heart attack at the home of his daughter in Jacksonville, Florida.

References 
 Oberlin College Archives
 福州基督教青年会追寻 

1865 births
1947 deaths
Protestant missionaries in China
Christian missionaries in Fujian
Hartford Seminary alumni
Oberlin College alumni
American expatriates in China
American Protestant missionaries